Malcolm Beaty (born 11 January 1939) is a former English cricketer. Beaty was a right-handed batsman who fielded as a wicket-keeper. He was born at Carlisle, Cumberland.

Beaty made his debut for Cumberland against Northumberland in the 1957 Minor Counties Championship. He played minor counties cricket for Cumberland from 1957 to 1979, making a total of 119 appearances for the county, the last of which came against the Lancashire Second XI. In 1978, he made four List A appearances for Minor Counties East in the Benson & Hedges Cup, against Middlesex, Sussex, Leicestershire, and Northamptonshire. He struggled in his four appearances with the bat, scoring just 2 runs at an average of 0.66.

References

External links
Malcolm Beaty at ESPNcricinfo
Malcolm Beaty at CricketArchive

1939 births
Living people
Sportspeople from Carlisle, Cumbria
Cricketers from Cumbria
English cricketers
Cumberland cricketers
Minor Counties cricketers
Wicket-keepers